WS-Federation Passive Requestor Profile is a Web Services specification - intended to work with the WS-Federation specification - which defines how identity, authentication and authorization mechanisms work across trust realms.  The specification deals specifically with how applications, such as web browsers, make requests using these mechanisms.  In this context, the web-browser is known as a "passive requestor."  By way of contrast, WS-Federation Active Requestor Profile deals with "active requestors" such as SOAP-enabled applications.  WS-Federation Passive Requestor Profile was created by IBM, BEA Systems, Microsoft, VeriSign, and RSA Security.

See also
 List of Web service specifications

References

External links
 WS-Federation: Passive Requestor Profile specification

Security